Udahentenna is a village in Sri Lanka. It is located within Central Province. It is situated along the B132 road from Dolosbage to Gampola.

Attractions 

 Theppakulam Lake
 Kabaragala Rock

Education 

 Senadhikari National School

See also
List of towns in Central Province, Sri Lanka

External links

Populated places in Kandy District